Dunnington is a village near the city of York, England. It may also refer to:

Places
Dunnington, East Riding of Yorkshire, England
Dunnington, Indiana, USA
Dunnington, Warwickshire, England

People with the name
Angus Dunnington (born 1967), English chess player
G. Waldo Dunnington (1906–1974), American biographer, professor, and translator
Jason Dunnington (born 1977), American politician
Sir John Dunnington-Jefferson, 1st Baronet (1884–1979), English soldier and politician

Other uses
Dunnington, an Intel processor